The UC Santa Barbara Gauchos women's basketball team is the basketball team that represents University of California, Santa Barbara in Santa Barbara, California, United States. The school's team currently competes in the Big West Conference.

History
As of the end of the 2015–16 season, the Gauchos have an all-time record of 699–581. They previously played in the SCWIAC from 1972–1976, the SCAA from 1976–1981, Independent status from 1981–1983, and the PCAA from 1983–1987 before it rebranded as the Big West Conference in 1987.  UCSB has the most Big West Conference tournament titles with 14, with 11 regular season titles in addition.  advanced to the Sweet Sixteen in 2004 after beating Colorado 76–49 and Houston 56–52. They lost 63–57 to Connecticut to end their run.

Year by Year Records

NCAA tournament results

References

External links